David Luna Sánchez (born February 27, 1975) is a Colombian lawyer, politician, and former Minister of Information Technologies and Communications. He previously served in Congress as the Member of House of Representatives for the Bogotá Constituency from 2006-2010.

Luna Sánchez studied Law at the University of Rosario and later graduated with a degree in Administrative Law from the same institution.

Later on, he earned a Masters Degree in Government and Public Policy from the Universidad Externado de Colombia.

In December 2021, Luna was confirmed as the primary candidate for the Colombian Senate for the Radical Change Party.

References

1975 births
Living people
Colombian politicians
21st-century Colombian lawyers
People from Bogotá
Del Rosario University alumni